Rosa María Díez González (born 27 May 1952) is a Spanish politician from Union, Progress and Democracy, UPyD deputy in the Congress of Deputies from 2008 to 2016.

Career 
She was a former Member of the European Parliament for the Spanish Socialist Workers' Party (PSOE), integrated in the Party of European Socialists. In 2007 she gave up her seat and left the PSOE particularly due to disagreement on what she perceived to be the Socialists' drift on individual liberties.

She founded a new political party called Unión, Progreso y Democracia in Spanish and Union, Progress and Democracy in English (UPyD), based on the existing movement of Basque citizens against ETA violence ¡Basta Ya!. In 2008 and 2011, she was elected to the Congress of Deputies representing Madrid district. In the Spanish General Elections of 2011, she was re-elected and her party was the fourth most voted party in Spain.

Díez personally advocates for lower public wages. Subsequently, and although she was the UPyD spokesperson on five committees, she was only paid for one of them.

On 24 May 2015, she announced she would not seek reelection as spokesperson of UPyD due to the party's poor performance in the regional and municipal elections.

In 2020, during the COVID-19 pandemic, she was proposed as prospective cabinet member in a "Salvation Government" by far-right Vox.

References

External links
 UPyD Website (in Spanish).
 UPyD Manifesto  (in Spanish).

1952 births
Living people
Leaders of political parties in Spain
Members of the 9th Congress of Deputies (Spain)
Members of the 10th Congress of Deputies (Spain)
MEPs for Spain 1999–2004
MEPs for Spain 2004–2009
20th-century women MEPs for Spain
21st-century women MEPs for Spain
People from Enkarterri
Recipients of the Order of Constitutional Merit
Spanish Socialist Workers' Party MEPs
Union, Progress and Democracy politicians